Attupokatha Ormakal is an autobiography by T. J. Joseph, written in Malayalam language, published in 2020 by DC Books.

Plot

Attupokatha Ormakal is based on Joseph's biography and interpretation about his controversial 2010 assault.

Translation
The book was translated to English by Nandakumar K., titled A Thousand Cuts.

References

Indian non-fiction books
2020 non-fiction books
Political books
Books about politics of India
21st-century Indian books